The Highland League Cup is a knock-out tournament contested since 1946 by football clubs in the Highland Football League. 

Brora Rangers are the current holders, while Keith are the most successful club, with 10 trophy wins.

Performance by club

References

Highland League Cup
Football cup competitions in Scotland
1946 establishments in Scotland
Recurring sporting events established in 1946